The Quickening is the fifth studio album by the southern California punk rock band The Vandals, released in 1996 by Nitro Records. Much of the album is characterized by themes of nihilism and teen angst, but presented with the tongue-in-cheek humor for which the band is known.

Both the band and the album attracted increased attention due to their involvement with the film Glory Daze. The Vandals recorded several songs for the film's soundtrack, including the main theme, and the soundtrack album was released on their Kung Fu Records label that had been started by guitarist Warren Fitzgerald and bassist Joe Escalante earlier that year. 

An independent music video was filmed for the song "It's a Fact" and two versions were released: one with clips from the movie and one without. Because drummer Josh Freese was not available due to other commitments, regular substitute Brooks Wackerman appears in the video as the band's drummer.

Recording labels 
Several studios were involved in the release of The Quickening, the album was produced by Warren Fitzgerald and recorded in early part of 1996 at various studios including Front Page Studios, Paramount Studios, Formula One Studios and the Planet of the Tapes Studios. 

The album was released on July 15, 1996, by Nitro Records.

Track listing

Performers
Dave Quackenbush - vocals
Warren Fitzgerald - guitar, vocals on "Hungry for You"
Joe Escalante - bass, backing vocals
Josh Freese - drums
Chris Lagerborg - backing vocals on "Allah"

Album information
Record label: Nitro Records
Recorded winter of 1996 at Front Page Studios, Paramount Studios, Formula One Studios, and Planet of the Tapes Studios.
All songs copyright and published 1996 by Puppety Frenchman Music, BMI.
Engineered by Warren Fitzgerald and Mon Agronot.
Mastered at Futuredisc by Tom Baker.
Produced by Warren Fitzgerald
Graphics by Mackie Osborne.
Cover photo by Joe Escalante.

1996 albums
The Vandals albums
Nitro Records albums